Melisophista is a genus of moths in the family Sesiidae.

Species
Melisophista geraropa Meyrick, 1927

References

Sesiidae